The Kirkwood Range is a massive coastal mountain range in Antarctica, extending north–south between Fry Glacier and Mawson Glacier. A broad low-level platform on the seaward side of the range is occupied by the Oates Piedmont Glacier. It was named by the New Zealand Northern Survey Party of the Commonwealth Trans-Antarctic Expedition (1956–58) for Captain Henry Kirkwood, Royal Navy, captain of the supply ship Endeavour during this period.

See also
Mount Cleary

References

Mountain ranges of Victoria Land
Scott Coast